The Furman Paladins women's basketball team is the basketball team that represents Furman University in Greenville, South Carolina, United States. The school's team currently competes in the Southern Conference.

History
The Paladins began play in 1969. As of the end of the 2015–16 season, they have an all-time record of 535–577. In their two NCAA Tournament appearances, they lost in the First Round each time, 90–52 to Louisiana Tech and 90–38 to Tennessee, respectively. They lost 74–68 to Auburn in their only WNIT appearance in 2014.

NCAA tournament results
The Paladins have appeared in two NCAA Tournaments, with a combined record of 0–2.

References

External links
 

 
Basketball teams established in 1969
1969 establishments in South Carolina